Matthew G. Glavy is a United States Marine Corps lieutenant general who serves as the Deputy Commandant for Information and 2nd commander of the Marine Corps Forces Strategic Command since July 7, 2021. He previously served as commander of the Marine Corps Forces Cyberspace Command from July 2, 2018 to July 7, 2021 and the first commander of Marine Forces Space Command from October 1, 2020 to July 7, 2021. Previously, he was the Commander of the 2nd Marine Aircraft Wing.

References

External links

Year of birth missing (living people)
Living people
Place of birth missing (living people)
United States Naval Academy alumni
United States Marine Corps generals